Bangabandhu Boulevard is an boulevard in Ankara, Turkey. In 1997, the avenue is named after Bangabandhu, founding father of Bangladesh

First given name of the avenue was “Bangabandhu Şeyh Muciburrahman Boulevard”. In November 9, 2020 the name was shortened by city council of Ankara. There is a sculpture of Sheikh Mujibur Rahman, the founding father of Bangladesh.

References

External links
 Bangabandhu Boulevard on google map

Çankaya, Ankara
Streets in Ankara
Memorials to Sheikh Mujibur Rahman
Bangladesh–Turkey relations